Marcenat is a commune in the département of Cantal and Auvergne-Rhône-Alpes region in south-central France.

Population

Sights
The Château d'Aubijou, which belonged to the Castellane family.
Orthodox monastery Russian architecture.

See also
Communes of the Cantal department

References

Communes of Cantal
Cantal communes articles needing translation from French Wikipedia